The Detroit Tigers' 1986 season was a season in American baseball. It involved the Detroit Tigers attempting to win the AL East.

Offseason
November 13, 1985: Bárbaro Garbey was traded by the Detroit Tigers to the Oakland Athletics for Dave Collins.
December 12, 1985: Darnell Coles was traded by the Seattle Mariners to the Detroit Tigers for Rich Monteleone.
January 16, 1986: Dave Engle was traded by the Minnesota Twins to the Detroit Tigers for Chris Pittaro and Alejandro Sánchez.

Regular season

Season standings

Record vs. opponents

Notable transactions
April 25, 1986: Brian Harper was signed as a free agent with the Detroit Tigers.
August 10, 1986: Ken Hill was traded by the Detroit Tigers with a player to be named later to the St. Louis Cardinals for Mike Heath. The Detroit Tigers sent Mike Laga (September 2, 1986) to the St. Louis Cardinals to complete the trade.
August 10, 1986: Dave Engel was released by the Detroit Tigers.

Roster

Player stats

Batting
Note: Pos= Position; G = Games played; AB = At bats; H = Hits; Avg. = Batting average; HR = Home runs; RBI = Runs batted in

Other batters
Note: G = Games played; AB = at bats; H = Hits; Avg. = Batting average; HR = Home runs; RBI = Runs batted in

Pitching

Starting pitchers 
Note; G = Games; IP = Innings pitched; W = Wins; L = Losses; ERA = Earned run average; SO = Strikeouts

Other pitchers 
Note; G = Games; IP = Innings pitched; W = Wins; L = Losses; ERA = Earned run average; SO = Strikeouts

Relief pitchers 
Note; G = Games; W = Wins; L = Losses; SV = Saves; ERA = Earned run average; SO = Strikeouts

Farm system

References

External links

1986 Detroit Tigers season at Baseball Reference

Detroit Tigers seasons
Detroit Tigers
Detroit Tiger
1986 in Detroit